Victoria Sanchez (born 24 January 1976) is a Canadian actress. She has appeared in more than forty films since 1990.

Personal life
Sanchez has a brother, Federico; the co-writer and director of Eternal. Her cousin is actor Liche Ariza.

Filmography

Film

Television

Video games

External links
 

1976 births
Living people
Canadian film actresses
Actresses from the Canary Islands